Ludwig Berger (born Ludwig Bamberger; 6 January 1892 – 18 May 1969) was a German-Jewish film director, screenwriter and theatre director. He directed more than 30 films between 1920 and 1969. Berger began working in the German film industry during the Weimar Republic. At Decla-Bioscop and later UFA he established a reputation as a leading director of silent films. He emigrated to Hollywood, but was unable to establish himself and returned to Europe. He subsequently worked both in France and Germany. He was a member of the jury at the 6th Berlin International Film Festival.

Berger also translated a few plays of Shakespeare, including Cymbeline, Hamlet, and Timon of Athens. His elder brother was the set designer Rudolf Bamberger who was killed in 1945.

Selected filmography

Film

 The Mayor of Zalamea (1920)
 The Story of Christine von Herre (1921)
 A Glass of Water (1923)
 The Lost Shoe (1923)
 A Waltz Dream (1925)
 The Master of Nuremberg (1927)
 Queen Louise (dir. Karl Grune, 1927)
 Sins of the Fathers (1928)
 The Woman from Moscow (1928)
 The Burning Heart (1929)
 The Vagabond King (1930)
 Playboy of Paris (1930)
 The Little Cafe (1931)
 I by Day, You by Night (1932)
 Early to Bed (1933)
 Waltz War (1933)
 Court Waltzes (1933)
 Pygmalion (1937)
 Three Waltzes (1938)
 Ergens in Nederland (1940)
 The Thief of Bagdad (1940)
 The Immortal Face (1947)
 Ballerina (1950)
 Stresemann (dir. Alfred Braun, 1957)

Television

1954: Die Spieler — based on The Gamblers by Nikolai Gogol
1954: Der Schauspieldirektor — based on Der Schauspieldirektor by Wolfgang Amadeus Mozart
1955: Frau Mozart
1955: Undine — based on Ondine by Jean Giraudoux
1957: Der Tod des Sokrates — based on Phaedo by Plato
1958: Der Widerspenstigen Zähmung — based on The Taming of the Shrew
1958: Was ihr wollt — based on Twelfth Night
1958: Viel Lärm um nichts — based on Much Ado About Nothing
1958: Wie es euch gefällt — based on As You Like It
1958: Maß für Maß — based on Measure for Measure
1958: Ein Sommernachtstraum — based on A Midsummer Night's Dream
1959: Das Paradies und die Peri — based on Paradise and the Peri and Lalla-Rookh
1960: Die Nacht in Zaandam
1961: Hermann und Dorothea — based on Hermann and Dorothea by Johann Wolfgang von Goethe
1962: Alpenkönig und Menschenfeind — based on a play by Ferdinand Raimund
1964: Ottiliens Tollheiten
1967: Samen von Kraut und Unkraut – Drei Szenen aus der Geschichte Hessens
1968: Odysseus auf Ogygia — based on a play by Fritz von Unruh
1969: Demetrius (co-director: Heribert Wenk) — based on Demetrius by Friedrich Schiller

References

External links

1892 births
1969 deaths
20th-century German male actors
German theatre directors
German male film actors
Knights Commander of the Order of Merit of the Federal Republic of Germany
Mass media people from Mainz
People from Rhenish Hesse
Translators of William Shakespeare
German male dramatists and playwrights
20th-century German dramatists and playwrights
German male poets
Jewish emigrants from Nazi Germany to the United States
20th-century German screenwriters
German male screenwriters
Actors from Mainz
German people of Belgian descent